Odites pelochrosta is a moth in the family Depressariidae. It was described by Edward Meyrick in 1933. It is found in Sierra Leone.

References

Moths described in 1933
Odites
Taxa named by Edward Meyrick